Bnei Akiva ("Children of Akiva") is the largest religious Zionist youth movement in the world, with over 125,000 members in 42 countries. It was first established in Mandatory Palestine in 1929.

History
Bnei Akiva was established on Lag BaOmer 1929 as the youth wing of the Mizrachi movement. Concurrent with the establishment of the movement in pre-independence Israel, organizations of religious youth operated in the Diaspora. In 1958, the Israeli and Diaspora groups merged to form the modern World Bnei Akiva, which operates both in and out of Israel for Diaspora youth, along with Bnei Akiva Israel, which operates in Israel for Israeli youth.

Ideology
Bnei Akiva's objectives are to educate Jewish youth with values of Torah and work, to provide stimulating experiential and informal opportunities for encountering Judaism, and to encourage Jewish continuity and leadership. Bnei Akiva's twin ideals of Torah and Avodah translate to religious commitment and work on the land of Israel.  Bnei Akiva believes in emigration to the land of Israel (Aliya) as a central commandment of Judaism, and maintains that the future of the Jewish people is tied to the state of Israel. In the organization's early years, Avodah was understood as meaning agricultural work, as reflected in the symbolism of the movement's emblem. In more recent years, there has driven a shift in ideology towards a broader definition of working for the development of the country. Members are encouraged to spend a year in Israel on organized learning and touring programs to broaden their knowledge of Israel and developing their leadership skills.

Similarly, the original socialist aims of Bnei Akiva are less actively pursued. Until the 1980s many Bnei Akiva members joined religious Kibbutzim in groups based on mutual army service or Aliya. Since the 1990s, Bnei Akiva members now typically settle in development towns and settlements.

Bnei Akiva actively promotes moving to the state of Israel in a process called aliya (literally meaning "to go up"), but the way in which this occurs has changed over the years. Until the 1990s, chanichim (trainees, disciples) were encouraged to make aliya in garinim (kernels, small groups) intended to bolster existing communities. These were almost always directed to a Kibbutz Hadati, and fierce debates took place as to whether any other form of aliya was a valid expression of the movement's ideals. Today the push for aliya is more general, with no specific communities or framework in mind. The focus is more on coming to Israel and contributing positively to society in any way.

Organizational framework
In Israel, Bnei Akiva is affiliated with the Religious Kibbutz Movement. It is run by a National Secretariat (Hanhala Artzit). Outside Israel, local branches of Bnei Akiva are under the Bnei Akiva Olami (Worldwide) organization. In every country, Bnei Akiva operates a network of Shabbat groups, summer camps, leadership seminars, Shabbatonim, and other activities.

Each age group from third grade to eighth grade has a section common to all scouts of the youth movement in Israel and around the world.

Symbols of Bnei Akiva

Emblem

Bnei Akiva's emblem displays wheat and farming tools, symbolizing the agricultural perspective of the ideology. It also shows the Tablets of Stone, displaying two letters of the Hebrew alphabet that stand for Torah VeAvoda, which means "Torah and work". The two perspectives of Torah and Avoda are tied together by the ribbon which displays the text "Bnei Akiva" on it.

Anthem

The Bnei Akiva's anthem, entitled Yad Achim, was composed by Michael Pearlman written by Moshe-Zvi Neria (originally known as Chaver Minkin). He wrote the anthem during the Chol HaMoed period of the holiday of Sukkot, 1932, at a gathering of youth leaders in Kfar Saba. Although the words and the melody have been changed to some extent, the anthem is sung on many Bnei Akiva occasions. It is sung in Hebrew.

Mifkad
Bnei Akiva branches all over the world start or end their meetings with mifkad, forming the letter Heth (a rectangle missing one of its smaller sides) using the participants. The mifkad is the assembly where announcements are made, members are counted and the ideology is reaffirmed. With slight variations, the text of mifkad is the same all over the world, following a basic structure.

Lexicon

Chapters

Australia
There are currently four snifim in Australia; one in Perth, one in Melbourne, and two in Sydney (in both Bondi and Maroubra). The Melbourne snif is the largest in Bnei Akiva Olami. Tochniot are held on Saturday afternoons, and bi-annual camps are run for each state. Other initiatives include weekly learning, group volunteer days, and regular minyanim. Bnei Akiva Melbourne runs an annual "Amazing Race" styled event. Bnei Akiva Sydney celebrated its 50th anniversary on November 7, 1999, at the Hakoah Club. Bnei Akiva Perth coordinates a number of events during the year including a themed Kabbalat Shabbat, providing gift baskets for Purim, an Israeli history movie night, and Shabbat dinners throughout the year. There is a federal summer camp held in December attended by senior chanichim from all snifim in Australia and New Zealand. Bnei Akiva Australia is a member of the Australasian Zionist Youth Council (AZYC).

Brazil
There are two snifim in Rio de Janeiro. One in Copacabana (named Snif Metzadah) and another one in Tijuca (named Snif Beit Yafah). Bnei Akiva's presence in São Paulo started in the early 50s. It now has two snifim, one in Higienópolis and one in Jardins. Bnei Akiva also has a snif in Belém. Today, Bnei Akiva has more participants than any other Zionist Youth Movement in Rio de Janeiro, making up to 180 chanichim and 70 madrichim. Bnei Akiva's activities include Shabbatonim, field trips, and camp; each year, in São Paulo and Rio de Janeiro, there are two camps, one in the winter and one in the summer, while Belém only has a summer camp. There are commemorations of the Jewish holidays in the local Bnei Akiva synagogues in Rio de Janeiro and Belém, and São Paulo, where there are two synagogues.

Europe

Netherlands
In the Netherlands, Bne Akiwa (the way it is transcribed in Dutch) started after the Holocaust period. During the latter half of the 20th century its main yearly activities were weekly pe'ulot on Shabbath in Amsterdam and on Sunday in other cities, summer and winter camps in the country, different European camps in the summer (Sayarim and Seminar Torani), Avoda summercamp in Israel, and participation in Hachshara year in Israel programs; Shabbath Ha'irgun weekend; publication of the magazine Zeraim. Different from other countries the movement is led by a Board which consists of members aged 16–22 years, placing a rather big responsibility on young shoulders, while the shaliach is the chairman. Many members have made aliya, while those who stay(ed) play(ed) significant roles in Jewish communal and non-Jewish life.

France
There are snifim in the larger cities such as Paris, Lyon, Marseille and Strasbourg. Paris hosts several snifim. Each year several mahanot are organized for the winter and summer holidays. A Shabbat is organized each year for all the madrichim around the country.

Belgium
There are two snifim in Belgium: one in Antwerp and one in Brussels. The larger snif in Antwerp has 120 members, while Brussels has 40.

Switzerland
Bnei Akiva Switzerland was founded in 1936. Numerous former Bnei Akiva Switzerland members have moved to Israel as a result of being in the youth movement. Today, Bnei Akiva Switzerland has more than 120 members in the two chapters (snifim), in Basel and Zurich. Geneva used to have its own chapter, but was closed by the parent organization in Israel because of a lack of interested members. Bnei Akiva is the biggest Jewish youth organization in Switzerland. Due to the lack of a Jewish high school in Switzerland, Bnei Akiva fulfills an important role as a regular meeting place. It is a vital entity that allows high-school students, who do not see each other on a daily basis, to stay in contact with their Jewish friends. Every year there are two camps, one in summer and one in winter. Additionally, the two oldest shvatim ("tribes") join the Sayarim summer camp (a camp in which usually the oldest shevet of chapters all over Europe take part) on a biannual basis, followed by a four-week Israel trip the following year. A number of Shabbatonim take place throughout the year, such as the Yom Yerushalayim weekend.

United Kingdom
Bnei Akiva in the UK was founded in 1939. Its beginnings were closely associated with Bachad and the Torah V'Avodah movement, which both encouraged moving to Israel. Arieh Handler was the main figure in the early growth of Bnei Akiva, as he brought over children from Nazi Europe on the Kindertransport and placed them in Bachad Hachshara (preparation) centres. These aimed to prepare the youth to work the land of Israel on kibbutzim by learning agricultural techniques. The first of these was at Gwrych Castle near Abergele, which held the first gathering of Bnei Akiva UK in December 1940. Between 1939 and 1941, Gwrych was home to between 250 and 300 children. Other hachshara centres were set up in Bromsgrove, Buckinghamshire and the most famous, Thaxted, Essex.

Many Kibbutzim, including Lavi and Beit Rimon, were founded by members of BAUK. In modern times, hachshara takes place in Israel and involves two schemes: Torani (the yeshiva and seminary track) and Kivun (giving participants a range of experiences in Israel). Bnei Akiva is the leading provider of gap years to Israel for 18-year-olds in the UK.

Nowadays, Bnei Akiva is the largest Jewish youth movement in the country, with more than 1,000 members paying Mas Chaver (membership) each year. It is run by five full-time sabbatical workers who work in the London Bayit, the offices of Bnei Akiva UK. Bnei Akiva also brings over families of shlichim (emissaries) from Israel, one serving as the Bnei Akiva rabbinical couple and one serving the northern communities. The mazkirut and shlichim together with the nivcharim [elected representatives], who are elected by the movement's members each year, form the Hanhalla [governing body]. 
 
Bnei Akiva runs 21 svivot (branches) around the UK. They run activities on Shabbat afternoons as well as running Succah Crawls, Family Friday Nights and Shabbatot Ha'Irgun. This year, there are active Bnei Akiva groups in, Barnet, Borehamwood & Elstree, Brondesbury Park, Bushey, Cheadle, Chigwell, Edgware, Finchley, Golders Green, Hale, Hampstead Garden Suburb, Hendon, Leeds, Mill Hill, Muswell Hill, Oxford, Pinner, Radlett, Salford, South Hampstead, South Woodford, Stanmore, Whitefield and Woodside Park. In 2022 Edgware hosted the largest sviva in the United Kingdom.

Areas which have previously hosted Svivot include, Accrington, Belmont, Birmingham, Bowdon, Edinburgh, Elephant & Castle, Kenton, Kingsbury,  Maida Vale, Newcastle, Redbridge, Scunthorpe, Sheffield,  Southgate,  Stamford Hill and Sunderland. The svivot mostly operate in local synagogues, however Bnei Akiva has two purpose-built buildings to house activities in Temple Fortune in London and Salford.

Bnei Akiva runs summer and winter camps (machanot) from school years 3–12. The winter camps include Aleph (Years Six & Seven), Ma'apilim (Year Eight), Haroeh (Year Nine), Gimmel (Year Ten) and Hadracha Course (Year Twelve). H-Course is a long-running leadership training camp which gives participants the skills to become the future leaders of the movement.

Summer camps include Ari (Years 3–6), Aleph (Year Six), Aleph Chalutzi (Year Seven), Bet Beis (Year Eight), Bet Chalutzi (Year Nine) and Gimmel (Year Ten). For Year 11, there is Israel Machane, a three-week-long tour visiting sites in Israel. In 2011, Machane Cadur Regel (Football Camp) ran for years 3–5 in partnership with Arsenal Football Club. Bnei Akiva also used to run the widely acclaimed Yachad programme, which caters for children with disabilities who want to be involved in camps.

In addition, there is a Beit Midrash Programme (BMP) which runs in conjunction with the other camps every summer. In recent years, Bnei Akiva has teamed up with Kaytana to run camps for Ethiopian children in Israel and also with Camp Simcha UK to run Keshet camp in London for children with serious illnesses. More than 1,000 people are involved in Bnei Akiva camps each year, making it the biggest provider of Jewish youth group camps in the UK.

Bnei Akiva UK actively supports projects in memory of Yoni Jesner who was heavily involved with the Glasgow branch of Bnei Akiva. He died from a critical head injury following a suicide bus bombing in Tel Aviv, Israel.

Mexico
Bnei Akiva in Mexico was founded in 1948. It is located in Mexico City, with three chapters and one main house, which is the center of activities. There are more than 100 active members in the movement and a large population of non-active members, those who have grown too old for the youth groups, or those who have "made Aliya". Bnei Akiva members are involved in community service such as participating in its institutions, studying in Jewish day schools, Hebrew schools and Yeshivot, and participating in Chessed activities (community service).

New Zealand
Bnei Akiva is one of the main Jewish youth movements in New Zealand, with weekly meetings and activities in Auckland and Wellington and national bi-annual camps. Bnei Akiva NZ's goal is to educate Jewish youth with the values of Torah ve'Avodah, combining a deeply rooted association with Israel together with day-to-day life in accordance with traditional Jewish values, and to provide stimulating experiential and informal opportunities for encountering Judaism. Bnei Akiva NZ ensures Jewish continuity and the future of the New Zealand Jewish community. Bnei Akiva New Zealand is a member of the Australasian Zionist Youth Council (AZYC).

United States and Canada
Bnei Akiva of the United States and Canada (known before 1993 as Bnei Akiva of North America) was formed by Rabbi Shaul Feldman after the 1950 merger between HaShomer HaDati and Bnei Akiva. It has several tiers of organization. At its most basic level, Bnei Akiva operates on a local level with Glilim (cities), which often contain one or more snifim (branches) where youth groups are run on Shabbat. Most Glilim are run by shlichim, (emissaries) from Israel, usually young couples. The first Bnei Akiva galil in America, technically belonging to HaShomer HaDati, was organized in Brooklyn by Meir Golombek in 1934, with additional Glilim forming around young leaders throughout the 1930s, 1940s and 1950s at a time when very little Zionist education was available in the United States. The level of activity in any given galil has fluctuated over the years depending on the level of leadership present.

In 2000, in an attempt to help Glilim that were without their own shlichim, Bnei Akiva of the United States and Canada formally added an additional regional infrastructure, with shlichim appointed to serve in a regional role and coordinate activities in several Glilim. The first such regional shaliach in North America was for the Midwest region was Ilan Frydman, today this position is filled by Yonatan Edrei.

In additional to the galil-based organization of Bnei Akiva, a second focus of activities in Bnei Akiva of the United States and Canada are the summer camps, known as Camp Moshava. The first Moshava, in Hightstown, New Jersey, was established in 1936. The largest camp is located in Indian Orchard, Pennsylvania, with 1,500 campers and 400 counselors. There are 4 additional smaller overnight camps Moshevet Stone, Moshava Canada Ennismore, Moshava Wild Rose and Moshava Alevy. Bnei Akiva also operates a number of local day camps during the summer 2 in New Jersey, Toronto, Chicago and Philadelphia. This follows the first attempt at such a program in Atlanta in the early 1990s.

Additionally, there are several national programs that are run by Bnei Akiva of the United States and Canada, most notably Mach Hach Ba'aretz, a six-week tour of Israel following 10th grade which attracts many participants who are not otherwise involved with Bnei Akiva. In addition they run Mach Hach L’Dorot and TVJ for 11th grade students.  This program was started in 1972 by members in Los Angeles, and has grown to be one of the most successful and popular programs offered by Bnei Akiva of the United States and Canada. These programs are all run by Rabbi Daniel Katz who additionally fills the role of Executive Director of YTVA.

another program, Machal, which is for graduates of 9th grade, was originally a national program, but is now run out of each camp separately. Various national shabbatonim are run by the national office, including Kenes Manhigei Chevraya Bet (KMCB) and Kenes Avodah which brings together some of the most promising young high school leaders for extra training. Together with a multitude of educational experiences run by the movements educational director Rabbi Dr Rafi Engelhart.

In the past decade Bnei Akiva opened its own Hachshara program MTVA and YTVA jointly with World Bnei Akiva under the leaders of Rabbi Shaul Feldman and Rabbi Yehuda Seif.

Bnei Akiva has 49 local chapters (snifim)across the US and Canada including Los Angeles, Seattle, Arizona, DC, Florida, Toronto, Hamilton, Montreal, New York and many more. These snifim are efficiently run by the national leadership team of Rabbi Shaul Feldman, Bini Dachs, Zehava Seidman, Natalie Vinegar, Robyn Adams and Talya Saban.

Boston
Bnei Akiva Boston has two active Snifim: Sharon Bnei Akiva in Young Israel of Sharon, and Newton Bnei Akiva (NBA) as a joint program between Congregations Beth El-Atereth Israel and Shaarei Tefillah. Bnei Akiva Boston recommenced activity in September 2007 after a decade-long hiatus. As of 2017, Sharon Bnei Akiva operates its weekly activities on Shabbat afternoons for 2–8th grade children while NBA operates on Shabbat afternoons in the Fall/Spring and Motzei Shabbat in the winter.

Chicago
Bnei Akiva of Chicago was established in 1935 is one of the largest Glilim in the country. Chicago hosts several local and regional shabbatonim each year. Galil Chicago has four snifim named Saad, Tirat Tzvi, Lakeview and Kfar Tzion. Chaverim from Chicago traditionally attend Camp Moshava in Wild Rose, Wisconsin, in the summers, and that Moshava is most associated with Galil Chicago. It is part of the Midwest Region.

Cleveland
Bnei Akiva Cleveland currently has more than 100 members, counting chanichim and madrichim. The city hosts a number of annual activities, including a Purim Carnival and Sukkot Festival, as well as a number of community programs such as Musicians Towers (prayers led by Bnei Akiva in a nursing home for the major Jewish holidays). The current shlichim in Cleveland are Eitan and Tayla Weiss, with two additional Bnot Sherut. Members of Bnei Akiva Cleveland typically attend Camp Stone in the summer, and that camp's headquarters is located in Cleveland. Galil Cleveland is part of the Midwest Region.

Florida
Bnei Akiva of Florida has 6 snifim in Miami, Williams Island, Hollywood, Boca Raton, Boca Raton West and Presidential.

Detroit
Bnei Akiva has been operating in Detroit since 1950. Bnei Akiva has three snifim that meet every Shabbat: at the Young Israel of Oak Park, at the Young Israel of Southfield and at Ohel Moed of Shomrey Emunah in West Bloomfield. Many members of Bnei Akiva of Detroit have moved to Israel, and one former shaliach, Otniel Schneller, previously served in the Knesset. Galil Detroit is in the Midwest Region, and campers primarily attend Camp Stone.

Hamilton

Bnei Akiva has had a long time small snif in Hamilton run by community Shlichim.

Houston

Bnei Akiva in Houston is run as part of the Youth Department of USOH and is part of the Southern Region of Bnei Akiva run by Shlomo Stern who was a former Shaliach in Houston. Today Bnei Akiva in Houston is run by Rafi & Shifra Engelhart supported by Wayne Yaffee.

Los Angeles
Bnei Akiva Los Angeles (BALA), founded in 1946, is one of the oldest and most active Glilim in North America. BALA has four snifim spread throughout Los Angeles, located in different areas of Los Angeles, namely, Hancock Park, North Hollywood, Beverly Hills, and Tarzana. Each is named after a famous present or past kibbutz in Israel. Each snif holds weekly programming on Shabbatot for chanichim ranging from 2nd through 5th grade. In addition to its four snifim, BALA holds frequent events and programming for its middle school and high school-age groups. BALA also runs a leadership program for ninth graders, in which budding Bnei Akiva leaders learn leadership skills in preparation for joining the counselor's staff the following year. After a period of stagnation and low participation in the 2000s, BALA has undergone a significant revival in recent years. In recent years BALA reopened its own Moshava at a new site Moshava Alevy.

Minneapolis

Bnei Akiva in Minneapolis is one of the newest and smallest snifim in North America .

Montreal
Bnei Akiva of Montreal has one branch. based in a Hebrew academy. It also runs annual programs such as Purim celebrations and Shabbatonim It is led primarily by the students of Hebrew Academy and other schools as well. Bnei Akiva Montreal runs weekly and monthly activities, educational training and inter-city sabbath activities.

Northeast
Bnei Akiva New York, New Jersey, and Boston (BANYNJABOS), the oldest galil in North America, has thousands of members in 17 chapters across the region. BANYNJABOS has branches in Teaneck, in several different major regions of New York, and in Newton. BANYNJABOS also runs sabbath activities and special events throughout the year for youth who are connected to Camp Moshava in Indian Orchard, Pennsylvania. Additional programs are run for college students, and largely focus on a commitment to live in Israel.

Philadelphia
Bnei Akiva of Philadelphia maintains three snifim: Northeast Philadelphia, Lower Merion and Cherry Hill, NJ. Galil Philadelphia prides itself on its dedicated and spirited core of madrichim. It is part of the Mid-Atlantic Region, and hosts a range of exciting activities and Shabbatonim each year while receiving guidance from college-aged bogrim. While the Northeast branch has been in existence for decades, Snif Lower Merion began weekly Shabbat programming in September 2003 under the leadership of Chava Forman. In September 2012, Galil Philadelphia added a third snif in Cherry Hill, New Jersey.

Pittsburgh
An active galil existed in Pittsburgh through the 1960s, until it became dormant. Activities resumed in 2005. Currently, Bnei Akiva of Pittsburgh operates a weekly snif out of the Shaare Torah synagogue. In addition, Bnei Akiva sponsors monthly social activities such as scavenger hunts, matza baking and trips to the movies. There is a special leadership program for 9th graders called Manhigut, which helps prepare them to be madrichim. It is a member of the Bnei Akiva Midwest region.

Potomac

Bnei Akiva of Potomac is run in the Beth Sholom Congregation and Talmud Torah under the supervision of Rabbi Eitan Cooper and the community Shaliach. This snif is the newest chapter in the Southern Region.

Silver Spring
Bnei Akiva of Silver Spring is part of the Southern Region. Bnei Akiva of Silver Spring, also known as BASS, runs biweekly Shabbat programming at Kemp Mill Synagogue for grades 3rd–6th as well as special ZA"CH activities for grades 7th–8th. BASS is responsible for the annual Yom HaZikaron and Yom Ha'atzmaut Tekes for the Greater Washington area at the Berman Hebrew Academy as well as other community youth activities.

St. Louis

Bnei Akiva St. Louis was founded in 2008. It has one snif that meets weekly. The Mazkir Galil is Nathaniel Chervitz and the Rosh Snif is Miryam Miller (c. 2022)

Toronto
Bnei Akiva of Toronto was started in 1935. Bnei Akiva of Toronto is known for being the biggest galil in the world outside of Israel. There are three snifim (BAYT, Ohr Chaim, and Shaarei Shamayim), with more than 100 children attending on Shabbat afternoon, as well as programming for grades 2–12 and university students throughout the year. There is also the Bnei Akiva-run camp Moshava Ennismore just outside Toronto, along with a day camp, Moshava Ba'ir Toronto, run in the city. Toronto houses the only Bnei Akiva yeshiva outside Israel, Yeshivat Ohr Chaim with Ulpanat Orot, forms Bnei Akiva Schools of Toronto. Currently, Nava Edery, Hadassah Strauss, and Jordan Jesin are the Mazkirim of Bnei Akiva of Toronto, following in the steps of their predecessors, Boaz Katzman and Talya Meyer. Bnei Akiva Toronto is a member of the Midwest Region.

Other Glilim
Additional cities with active Bnei Akiva chapters include Atlanta, Baltimore, Columbus, Dallas, Denver, Hollywood, FL, Houston, Minneapolis, Hamilton, Potomac, Silver Spring, and Washington. In the past, there have been several other chapters, including Boca Raton, Memphis, Miami, Phoenix, San Diego, San Francisco, and Seattle.

Gap Year Programming
Historically, Bnei Akiva has operated several Gap Year programs. Until the 1980s, members of Bnei Akiva of the US and Canada participated in Hakhshara. Since 1982, Bnei Akiva has offered a program called Tochnit Nissan for members studying in Israel during the month of Nissan. Traditionally, this program took place on a kibbutz, though other options are now offered. In the early 1990s, a program called Midrash Uma'aseh existed and drew many of the most involved members of Bnei Akiva.

For the 2014–2015 year, Bnei Akiva in the United States and Canada launched a seminary and a yeshiva program in the Katamon neighborhood of Jerusalem. It offers several months of Torah study in an Israeli yeshiva or midrasha setting, along with targeted internships, volunteering and service learning, which can include living and working on a Kibbutz. Gap year students affiliated with Bnei Akiva may also attend a range of other yeshivot and seminaries affiliated with Bnei Akiva ideology.

South Africa
Bnei Akiva's presence in South Africa dates back to the 1920s. Today, it is one of the largest active Jewish youth movements in the country. It runs many shabbatonim as well as weekly activities at its various centres on the country. Bnei Akiva runs a month-long annual summer camp in the Western Cape, which is attended by more than 1,000 campers and counselors. There is also a winter camp held in different locations each year, and is attended by youth from all over South Africa. The movement also runs many Israel programs throughout the year including MTA, Tafnit, Hadracha Tzeira, Kfar Haroeh and Bema'aleh.

See also
Mizrachi (Religious Zionism)
Orthodox Judaism
Religious Kibbutz Movement
Religious Zionism

References

External links
Bnei Akiva of the US and Canada
World Bnei Akiva
Yeshivot Bnei Akiva – In Israel (Hebrew)
American Friends of Yeshivot Bnei Akiva
Bnei Akiva UK
 

Youth organizations based in Israel
Zionist youth movements
Orthodox Judaism
Jewish clubs and societies
Religious Zionist organizations
Jewish organizations established in 1929
Rabbi Akiva